The  Washington Valor season was the second season for the franchise in the Arena Football League. The Valor play at the Capital One Arena. The team finished fourth at the end of the regular season. After losing the first game of their semifinal series against the Albany Empire, the Valor won the second game and advanced to ArenaBowl XXXI by virtue of aggregate score. The Valor would go on to win the Arena Bowl by defeating the Baltimore Brigade 69–55.

Standings

Staff

Roster

Schedule

Regular season
The 2018 regular season schedule was released on February 13, 2018.

Playoffs

References

Washington Valor
Washington Valor seasons
21st century in Washington, D.C.
2018 in sports in Washington, D.C.
ArenaBowl champion seasons